The Georgian Room was a restaurant on the tenth floor of Portland, Oregon's Meier & Frank Building, in the United States. The Nines occupies space which had housed the restaurant. The Georgian Room hosted "ladies who lunch" and has been described as "a popular luncheon spot for well-to-do Portland women".

In 2016, Grant Butler included the Georgian Room in The Oregonian list of "97 long-gone Portland restaurants we wish were still around", writing, "Since the 1930s, this was a spot where ladies lunched on iceberg lettuce salads and chicken a la king. The food was hardly remarkable, but there was a sense that you were dining in a place with history. And the atmosphere – sea foam-green walls, majestic curtains, crystal chandeliers – was like an elegant grandma."

See also
 List of defunct restaurants of the United States

References

External links

 Oregon Places: The Georgian Room at Meier & Frank
 Georgian Room at Zomato

Defunct restaurants in Portland, Oregon
Meier & Frank
Southwest Portland, Oregon